Axinidris ghanensis is a species of ant in the genus Axinidris. Described by Shattuck in 1991, the species is endemic to Ghana and Uganda, based on two collections.

References

Axinidris
Hymenoptera of Africa
Insects described in 1991